Harley M. Flanders (September 13, 1925 – July 26, 2013) was an American mathematician, known for several textbooks and contributions to his fields: algebra and algebraic number theory, linear algebra, electrical networks, scientific computing.

Life
Flanders was a sophomore calculus student of Lester R. Ford at the Illinois Institute of Technology and asked for more challenging reading. Ford recommended A Course in Mathematical Analysis by Edouard Goursat, translated by Earle Hedrick, which included challenging exercises. Flanders recalled in 2001 that the final exercise required a proof of a formula for the derivatives of a composite function, generalizing the chain rule, in a form now called the Faa di Bruno formula.

Flanders received his bachelors (1946), masters (1947) and PhD (1949) at the University of Chicago on the dissertation Unification of class field theory advised by Otto Schilling and André Weil.
He held the Bateman Fellowship at Caltech.  He joined the faculty at University of California at Berkeley. In 1955 Flanders heard Charles Loewner speak there on continuous groups. Notes were taken and the lectures appeared in a limited form with the expectation that Loewner would produce a book on the topic. With his death in 1968 the notes drew the attention of Murray H. Protter and Flanders. They edited Loewner's talks and in 1971 The MIT Press published Charles Loewner: Theory of Continuous Groups. The book was re-issued in 2008.

Teaching posts Flanders held included the faculty at Purdue University (1960), Tel Aviv University (1970–77), visiting professor at Georgia Tech (1977–78), visiting scholar at Florida Atlantic University (1978–85), University of Michigan, Ann Arbor (1985–97, 2000–), University of North Florida (1997–2000) and, distinguished mathematician in residence at Jacksonville University (1997–2000).

Flanders was Editor-in-Chief, American Mathematical Monthly, 1969–1973. He also wrote calculus software MicroCalc, ver 1–7 (1975–).

In 1991 Flanders was invited to the first SIAM workshop on automatic differentiation, held in Breckenridge, Colorado. Flanders' chapter in the Proceedings is titled "Automatic differentiation of composite functions". He presented an algorithm inputting two n-vectors of (higher) derivatives of F and G at a point, which used the chain rule to construct a linear transformation producing the derivative of the composite F o G. With prompting from editor Griewank, Flanders included application of the algorithm to automatic differentiation of implicit functions. Recalling his early exposure to the formula of Faa di Bruno, Flanders wrote, "I think Faa's formula is quite inefficient for the practical computation of numerical (not symbolic) derivatives."

Harley Flanders died July 26, 2013, in Ann Arbor, Michigan.

Differential forms
Flanders is known for advancing an approach to multivariate calculus that is independent of coordinates through treatment of differential forms.
According to Shiing-Shen Chern, "an affine connection on a differentiable manifold gives rise to covariant differentiations of tensor fields. The classical approach makes use of the natural frames relative to local coordinates and works with components of tensor fields, thus giving the impression that this branch of differential geometry is a venture through a maze of indices. The author [Flanders] gives a mechanism which shows that this is not necessarily so."

In 1954, Flanders considered the converse of the Poincaré lemma.

In 1963, Flanders published Differential Forms with Applications to the Physical Sciences which connected applied mathematics and differential forms. A reviewer affirmed that the book forms such a bridge with differential geometry. The book was republished in 1989 by Dover Books.

Awards
MAA Lester R. Ford Award 1969
NCRIPTAL/EDUCOM Distinguished Software Award 1987
NCRIPTAL/EDUCOM Distinguished Software Award 1989
Lifetime Senior Member, IEEE 1998

Mathematics education
In 1970, Flanders published the first of several useful textbooks for topics commonly taught at college level: with Justin Jesse Price and Robert R. Korfhage a text on Calculus was distributed by Academic Press. With J. J. Price, Flanders also wrote Elementary Functions and Analytic Geometry (1973) and Introductory College Mathematics: with Linear Algebra and Finite Mathematics (1974). With both J.J. Price and R.R. Korfhage, Flanders wrote First Course in Calculus with Analytic Geometry (1974) and Second Course in Calculus (1974).

To support the recruitment of students with capacity to follow these courses, some works on precalculus mathematics were written with J.J. Price: Algebra (1975), Trigonometry (1975), Algebra and Trigonometry (1981), Precalculus Mathematics (1981), and College Algebra (1982).

Flanders continued with Single-Variable Calculus (1981) and another Calculus in 1985

In 1984, Flanders published his textbook on Pascal language:  Scientific Pascal (1984) for which a second edition was published in 1996 by Birkhäuser. That year he also published Calculus: A lab course with MicroCalc (Springer-Verlag).

Selected papers
 

with P. M. Lin: 

with Harald K. Wimmer: 

with Harald K. Wimmer: 

with Herbert Fischer:

References

20th-century American mathematicians
21st-century American mathematicians
University of Chicago alumni
University of California, Berkeley faculty
Purdue University faculty
Academic staff of Tel Aviv University
2013 deaths
1925 births
Jacksonville University faculty
University of Michigan staff
American textbook writers
The American Mathematical Monthly editors